Rebecca Oppenheimer is an American astrophysicist and one of four curator/professors in the Department of Astrophysics at the American Museum of Natural History (AMNH) on Manhattan's Upper West Side. Oppenheimer is a comparative exoplanetary scientist. She investigates planets orbiting stars other than the Sun. Her optics laboratory is the birthplace of a number of new astronomical instruments designed to tackle the problem of directly seeing and taking spectra of nearby solar systems with exoplanets and studying their composition, with the ultimate goal of finding life outside the solar system.

Early life and education 
Oppenheimer attended the Horace Mann School in the Bronx. After graduating in 1990, she attended Columbia University, where she was an I. I. Rabi Science Scholar. She received a B.A. in Physics from Columbia in 1994. In 1999 she was granted a Ph.D. in astrophysics from the California Institute of Technology and spent the following two years at the University of California at Berkeley on a Hubble Space Telescope Postdoctoral Research Fellowship. In 2001, she moved back to New York City to research at the AMNH, where she joined the faculty in 2004. Oppenheimer regularly gives public and professional lectures on astronomical research.

Career 
Oppenheimer holds an adjunct professorship at Columbia University's Department of Astronomy and has published over two hundred and sixty research and public-oriented science articles, with an h-index over 55 and more than 10,000 citations. She holds three patents, is the co-discoverer of the first brown dwarf, Gliese 229B, and is active in research on exoplanets.  She has led or co-led many novel instrumentation projects, including the Lyot Project, Project 1640, the Gemini Planet Imager, Palomar Adaptive Optics, and the Palomar Advanced Radial Velocity Instrument.

Oppenheimer also works on ultracool white dwarfs, the end states of 99% of stars, including the Sun, their role in comprising the baryonic dark matter, as well as coronagraphy, the art of seeing faint celestial objects next to bright ones.  Oppenheimer has served on numerous NASA advisory committees including the TPF Science and Technology Definition Team, The NASA Astrophysics Senior review for 2014, 2016 (Chair), and 2019, as well as various NSF and NRC committees.  Oppenheimer has been a member of NASA's Exoplanet Technology Assessment Committee since 2015.

She is an active member of the American Astronomical Society and the International Astronomical Union. She is a member of the A,B,C,D,F, and G affiliations within the IAU.

Oppenheimer's education-related efforts at the AMNH include curating the AstroBulletin series of news items and bi-annual documentaries.  She is also Curator-in-Charge of the Digital Universe Atlas. She co-curated the space show Journey to the Stars and curated the exhibit Searching for New Worlds.  Her video, "The Known Universe," created as part of an exhibit with the Rubin Museum, is an early example of a science video going viral on YouTube in 2009.

According to Google Scholar, Oppenheimer's peer-reviewed articles as of 2021 have been cited 10,878 times. Her h-index is 55 and i10-index is 133.

Awards and honors 

 2020: inStyle Magazine, 50 Badass Women of 2020, 16th
 2019: Fulcrum Arts Honoree for accomplishments at the intersection of science and art
 2009: Blavatnik Award for Young Scientists, New York Academy of Sciences
 2003: Carter Memorial Lecturer, Carter Observatory, Wellington, New Zealand
 2002-2004: Kalbfleisch Research Fellowship, American Museum of Natural History
 2002: National Academies of Science, Beckman Frontiers of Science, Invited Participant
 1999-2002: Hubble Postdoctoral Research Fellowship 
 1994-1997: National Science Foundation Graduate Research Fellowship
 1990-1994: I.I. Rabi Science Scholar, Columbia University 
 1990: Westinghouse Science Competition, Honorable Mention
 1989: New York Academy of Sciences Science Writing Competition, First Place

Personal life
Oppenheimer grew up in the Upper West Side in Manhattan, NY. Oppenheimer is a trans woman and an activist for the rights of LGBT people.  She came out in 2014 and was featured in a New York Times piece where she wrote about being transgender and a scientist.

References

External links 
 Rebecca Oppenheimer at American Museum of Natural History
 Department of Astrophysics at American Museum of Natural History
 The Lyot Project

American women astronomers
Living people
LGBT people from New York (state)
American LGBT scientists
Scientists from New York City
People associated with the American Museum of Natural History
California Institute of Technology alumni
Columbia College (New York) alumni
Horace Mann School alumni
Transgender women
1972 births
Transgender academics
Transgender scientists
Columbia University faculty